The Al Haliq Mosque is a mosque in Tunis, Tunisia, located in the Sidi El Bechir arrondissement.

Localization 
The mosque is located near Bab Jedid and Al Marr Street. According to the legend, a widow sold her jewels to finance its construction, hence the name of "haliq", meaning "rings of a gold ornament".

References 

Mosques in Tunis

Hafsid architecture